Taytay, officially the Municipality of Taytay,  is a 1st class municipality in the province of Palawan, Philippines. According to the 2020 census, it has a population of 83,357 people.
 
Since 2002, its Cathedral of St. Joseph the Worker is the episcopal see of the pre-diocesan missionary Apostolic Vicariate of Taytay.

History 
In the 1200s, the Chinese recorded that the nation Sandao once ruled over Palawan. Eventually, before the arrival of the Spanish, the Kingdom of Taytay came to be and was ruled by a monarch noted as being followed everywhere at any given time by ten scribes. The crew of Ferdinand Magellan held the King of Taytay and his consort hostage for ransom after escaping the Battle of Mactan where Magellan was slain. They intended to secure more supplies as they plan to cross into the Moluccas to seek help from the Portuguese there. The king and his subjects complied with the Spaniards’ demands and even added more food supplies than what were asked for. This was duly recorded by Antonio Pigafetta, Magellan's chronicler, who was onboard one of the ships when these events took place.

Pigafetta also noted a curious thing in the Kingdom: the natives were fond of cockfighting, long before this pastime was seen or even heard of in the Western Hemisphere.

During the Spanish colonization of the Philippines, Taytay was formally founded in 1623. Taytay became the capital of the province of Calamianes, the entire territory of Paragua (now Palawan), in 1818; and the province of Castilla, a land area occupying the northern part of Palawan, in 1858.

Archived baptismal records in Cuyo, Palawan show that the last monarch of the Kingdom of Taytay was baptised into Catholic Church with the name Flores de los Santos Cabaylo (“Cabaylo, Flower of the Saints”). No other sovereign royal datu after him ruled the kingdom. King Cabaylo's descendants include the present clans of Cabaylo-Manlavi-Gabinete-Macolor as main genealogical roots. His Royal Highness Datu Dr. Fernando Macolor Cruz, who hailed from the Cabailo-Manlavi-Gabinete-Macolor line of the royal house, is the present and sole pretender to the throne of the Kingdom of Taytay.

During the American era, Taytay ceased being Palawan's capital, and its administrative boundary was reduced by approximately 50,000 hectares upon the creation of the Municipality of El Nido in 1916.

The historic Taytay Fort, the Fuerza Santa Isabel de la Paragua, built in 1667 under the Augustinian Recollect Fathers and named in honor of Spain's Queen Isabela II in the 19th century, was used as a military station during that period. This famous relic was completed in 1738. It was mainly used to defend against Muslim warrior-raiders in their colorful war boats while the Spanish soldiers fire at them with their huge cannons. The fort's small chapel and cannons are still intact. The fort is now under the supervision of the Municipal Government of Taytay. The Moro action must be understood not as an act of piracy but as a showdown of power and challenge to Spanish hegemony over the islands. It can be viewed as the Tausug's efforts to recover what was once theirs. Similar raids were also carried out against Christian converts in Spanish Cuyo, Dumaran, Linapacan and Culion.

In 1957, the Island of Debangan was constituted into a barrio.

Geography

Barangays
Taytay is politically subdivided into 31 barangays.

History of barangays

Tumbod.                  1972.                      Liminangcong

Climate

Demographics

Economy

Gallery

References

External links 

Taytay Profile at PhilAtlas.com
[ Philippine Standard Geographic Code]
Philippine Census Information
Local Governance Performance Management System

Municipalities of Palawan
Former provincial capitals of the Philippines
1623 establishments in the Philippines